"Everyone" is the penultimate track on Van Morrison's 1970 album Moondance.

The song is the fastest on the album. It is in 12/8 time and features more prominent acoustic guitar than other tracks on Moondance where the piano is the main instrument. A notable feature of the intro is a clavinet. A hard but sparse drumbeat is offset by a melody played on the flute throughout the song, including a solo after the second chorus.

Morrison has said "'Everyone' is just a song of hope, that's what that is."

The song was used for the final shot of the film The Royal Tenenbaums, but did not appear on any of the film's soundtrack releases.

Personnel on original release
Van Morrison – vocals
John Klingberg – bass
Jeff Labes – clavinet
Gary Mallaber – drums
John Platania – guitar
Jack Schroer – soprano saxophone
Collin Tilton – flute

Notes

References
Yorke, Ritchie (1975). Into The Music, London:Charisma Books,

External links
[ Everyone] at allmusic

1969 songs
Van Morrison songs
Songs written by Van Morrison
Song recordings produced by Lewis Merenstein
Song recordings produced by Van Morrison